Nebiogastes (Greek: Νεοβιγάστης or Νεβιγάστιος; died 407 AD) was a Roman military commander that supported the usurper Constantine III.

Life 
Nebiogastes was an officer of the Western Roman army in Britain. In 407 the general Claudius Constantine (Constantine III) rebelled against Emperor Honorius and appointed Nebiogastes and Iustinianus magistri militum of the army of Gaul. Constantine crossed the English Channel and attacked the troops loyal to Honorius in Gaul. Nebiogastes was persuaded to meet with Sarus, one of Honorius' generals, but was betrayed and killed.

Sources 
 Olympiodorus of Thebes, fragment 12
 Zosimus, VI.2.2-3.
 "Nebiogastes", Prosopography of the Later Roman Empire, Volume II, p. 773–4.

407 deaths
5th-century Romans
Magistri militum
Year of birth unknown